John Haase may refer to:

 John Haase (author)
 John Haase (criminal)